Indu Malhotra is a retired judge and senior counsel of the Supreme Court of India.  She was the second woman to be designated as Senior Advocate by the Supreme Court. She was the first woman advocate to be elevated as a judge of the Supreme Court of India directly from the bar. She also authored the third edition of The Law and Practice of Arbitration and Conciliation (2014).

Early life and education
Indu Malhotra, the youngest child of Om Prakash Malhotra, a Supreme Court senior advocate and author, and Satya Malhotra, was born  in Bangalore on 14 March 1956. 

Malhotra attended Carmel Convent School, New Delhi, before studying for a B.A. (Hons.), and subsequently Masters, in political science from Lady Shri Ram College, University of Delhi. After obtaining her master's degree, she worked briefly as a lecturer in political science at Miranda House and Vivekananda College, Delhi University.
In 1982 she completed a Bachelor of Laws from the Campus Law Centre of the Faculty of Law, University of Delhi.

Career

Indu Malhotra joined the legal profession in 1983, and was enrolled with the Bar Council of Delhi. In 1988 she qualified as an advocate-on-record in the Supreme Court, and secured the first position in the examination, for which she was awarded the Mukesh Goswami Memorial Prize on National Law Day.

Malhotra was appointed as the Standing Counsel for the State of Haryana in the Supreme Court from 1991 to 1996. She represented various statutory corporations before the Supreme Court, including the Securities Exchange Board of India (SEBI), Delhi Development Authority (DDA), Council for Scientific and Industrial Research (CSIR), and Indian Council for Agricultural Research (ICAR). In 2007, she was designated senior advocate by the Supreme Court of India. She became the second woman to be designated by the Supreme Court after a gap of over 30 years. She has been appointed amicus curiae by different benches of the Supreme Court in some matters. Recently, she was appointed as an amicus for restoration of Jaipur as a heritage city.

Malhotra specializes in the law of arbitration, and has appeared in various domestic and international commercial arbitrations. In December 2016, Indu was made a member of the High Level Committee (HLC) in the Ministry of Law and Justice to review institutionalization of the arbitration mechanism in India.

After serving as legal counsel in the Supreme Court for 30 years, Malhotra was unanimously recommended for appointment as a judge of the Supreme Court.  Her appointment was confirmed and ordered by the Government on 26 April 2018; she was the first woman judge to be elevated directly from the Bar. Malhotra retired on 13 March 2021.

Important cases
Some of the important cases in which Her Ladyship Hon'ble Justice Indu Malhotra has appeared are:

• Navtej Singh Johar & Ors. versus Union of India thr. Secretary Ministry of Law and Justice (2018)

• Joseph Shine versus Union of India (2018)
India Oxygen v. Collector of Central Excise [1998 Suppl. SCC 658]
Union of India v. Harjeet Singh Sandhu [(2001) 5 SCC 593]
SBP & Co. v. Patel Engineering Ltd. [(2005) 8 SCC 618]
Jaya Shah v. Bombay Stock Exchange [(2004) 1 SCC 160]
Harshad C. Modi v. DLF [(2005) 7 SCC 791]
Everest Copiers v. State of Tamil Nadu [(1996) 5 SCC 390]
Khaleel Ahmed Dakhani v. Hatti Gold Mines Co. Ltd. [(2000) 3 SCC 755]
Harish Verma & Ors. v. Ajay Srivastava [(2003) 8 SCC 69]
Hindustan Poles Corporation v. Commissioner of Central Excise [(2006) 4 SCC 85]
R. Kalyani v. Janak C. Mehta & Ors. [(2009) 1 SCC 516]
Ramesh Kumari v. State (NCT of Delhi)
Booz Allen Hamilton Inc. v. S.B.I. Home Finance Ltd. & Ors [(2011) 5 SCC 532]
Yograj Infrastructure Ltd. v. Ssang Yong Engineering & Construction Co. Ltd. [(2011) 9 SCC 735]
Union of India v. Master Construction Co. [(2011) 12 SCC 349]
P.R. Shah, Shares and Stock Broker (P) Ltd. v. B.H.H. Securities (P) Ltd. [(2012) 1 SCC 594]
A.C. Narayanan v. State of Maharashtra [(2013) 11 SCALE 360]
Pune Municipal Corporation & Another v. Harakchand Misirimal Solanki & Others, [(2014) 3 SCC 183].

Justice Malhotra specialises in the law of arbitration, and has appeared in various domestic and international commercial arbitrations. She is a Fellow of the Chartered Institute of Arbitrators (CIArb.) in England. She has been empanelled as an arbitrator with several institutional arbitration bodies such as the Indian Council of Arbitration (ICA) and the Delhi International Arbitration Centre (DAC). She recently authored a commentary on the Arbitration and Conciliation Act, 1996. Eminent jurists have described it as a legal classic on arbitration.  Her dissenting note on the majority judgement for allowing women's entry in to the famous Sabari mala temple received wide attention. As the sole women justice on the panel she noted in her dissenting judgement that "what constitutes an essential religious practice is for the religious community to decide" and not a matter that should be decided by the courts. She added that "notions of rationality cannot be invoked in matters of religion by courts".

Justice Malhotra was a part of the 5 justices constitutional bench of the historical judgment that decriminalized consensual same sex relationships in India and extended Article 15 of the Constitution of India to include sexual orientation and gender identity. The same bench comprising her, declared the section 497 of IPC as unconstitutional. Justice Malhotra was part of the two-judge panel that awarded the shebaitship of Padmanabhaswamy Temple to the Travancore Royal family in 2020.

Membership of committees and nominations
Malhotra has been a member of various committees constituted by the Supreme Court from time to time, including the Vishakha Committee. She was nominated as a member of the editorial committee for publication of the official journal of the National Legal Services Authority, "Nyaya Deep", between 2004 and 2013. In 2009 was nominated as a member of the Central Authority of the National Legal Services Authority, a statutory body constituted under the Legal Services Authorities Act, 1987. In 2005 she was appointed a member of the Supreme Court (Middle Income Group) Legal Aid Society, constituted by the Supreme Court of India for 3 years. She was nominated as a member of the Indo-British Legal Forum held in 2003, and again in 2008. She represented India in the Convention on the Rights of the Child, held by the Commonwealth Secretariat in May 1998 at Dhaka, Bangladesh. In 2005 she was nominated by the Chief Justice of India as a member of the General Council of the Gujarat National Law University, in the category of "eminent persons". She has been nominated by the Ministry of Corporate Affairs to the Central Council and Disciplinary Committee of the Institute of Chartered Accountants of India, a statutory body established under the Chartered Accountants Act, 1949.

Social work
Justice Malhotra is a trustee of the SaveLIFE Foundation, a non-profit, non-governmental organisation which aims to prevent traffic accidents, and to formulate a system for providing immediate post-accident response to save the life of victims of traffic accidents.

Publications and academic pursuits
Indu Malhotra has authored a Commentary on the Law and Practice of Arbitration in India, which was released on 7 April 2014  by the Hon'ble Chief Justice of India. 
She has published articles in various journals and magazines.

Bibliography
 The Law and Practice of Arbitration and Conciliation: The Arbitration and Conciliation Act (1996)

References

1956 births
Living people
Faculty of Law, University of Delhi alumni
Indian Senior Counsel
Justices of the Supreme Court of India
Lady Shri Ram College alumni
Scholars from Bangalore
20th-century Indian lawyers
20th-century Indian women lawyers
21st-century Indian judges
21st-century Indian women judges